The 2021 Dally M Awards were presented over two nights at the Howard Smith Wharves in Brisbane on the 20th and 27th September 2021. The first night highlighted the minor awards featured in the Dally M Awards as well as building anticipation for the second night which presented the major awards and the Dally M Medal. They are the official annual awards of the National Rugby League and are named after Dally Messenger.

Dally M Medal 
Dally M Player of the Year:  Tom Trbojevic

Cody Walker was deducted 3 votes for being suspended in Round 5.

Dally M Awards 
The Dally M Awards are, as usual, conducted at the close of the regular season and hence do not take games played in the finals series into account.

Team of the Year

See also 

 Dally M Awards
 Dally M Medal
 2021 NRL season

Notes

References 

Dally M Awards
2021 NRL season
2021 awards